Precept is an interdenominational Christian evangelical organization based in Chattanooga, Tennessee whose stated mission is to engage people in relationship with God through scriptural studies. The ministry ministers to adults, teens and children through Bible study leader training workshops, Bible studies, and an Israel tour to biblical sites and conferences.

The organization is a nonprofit ministry and a member of the Evangelical Council for Financial Accountability (ECFA).

History 
Precept was founded by Jack and Kay Arthur in 1970. 

In 2008 Precept made $12.9 million in revenue.

Jack and Kay's son, David Arthur, took over as CEO in 2012.

Ministries

Student Ministry 
Transform Student Ministries is a department of Precept which ministers to minors, especially those in high school and college. Annually, they offer the ENGAGE Internship which takes place over a 10-week span between May through July to train college-age students and young adults to engage in God's Word through the Inductive Bible Study method.

In 2022 Precept stopped offering their summer Boot Camp and Encounter conferences. Prior to 2022, they held an ENCOUNTER Student Conference semi-annually in the fall and winter. Their  EQUIP Boot Camp program took place in June and early July. Daily activities included Bible study, worship, prayer, sports and fellowship with other campers.

Programs

Bible Study Training 
Precept's main method of engaging people with God is by equipping them to become Precept Bible Study Leaders through training workshops both nationally and internationally. The year-round training and resources Precept offers are designed to increase Bible study and leadership skills. After being trained, leaders are sent back to their local communities to lead small group Bible Studies using the Precept Bible Study Method.

Precepts for Life 
Precept produced Kay Arthur's daily radio and television program Precepts for Life, which provides instruction in Bible study. In 2009 the program received the National Religious Broadcasters award for "Best Television Teaching Program." Kay Arthur was named to the National Religious Broadcasters Hall of Fame in 2011.

Publishing 
Precept also publishes books and Bible studies that have been translated into 70 languages.

References

External links

 

Christian organizations established in 1970
Non-profit organizations based in Tennessee
Evangelical denominations in North America
Christian organizations established in the 20th century